Qahej may refer to:
 Qahej-e Bala, a village in Kharqan Rural District in Semnan Province, Iran
 Qahej-e Pain, a village in Kharqan Rural District, Semnan Province, Iran